The 130th Rescue Squadron (130 RQS) is a unit of the California Air National Guard 129th Rescue Wing located at Moffett Federal Airfield, Mountain View, California. The 130th is equipped with the HC-130J Combat King II. If activated to federal service, the 130 RQS is gained within the United States Air Force by the Air Combat Command (ACC).

Overview
The 130th RQS flies four HC-130J Combat King IIs, a version of the C-130 specially modified for probe-and-drogue aerial refueling and combat search-and-rescue missions. These aircraft extend the range of the wing's HH-60G Pave Hawk helicopters with an air refueling capability.

Established on 1 October 2003 by the Air Force Special Operations Command as part of a re-organization of Air National Guard rescue units which created separate squadrons for fixed-wing, helicopter and pararescue elements of the 129th Rescue Wing.   All three squadrons are assigned to the 129th Operations Group.  The HH-60 helicopter flight became 129th Rescue Squadron; the HC-130P Hercules flight become the 130th Rescue Squadron, and the pararescue flight became the 131st Rescue Squadron. On 6 April 2018 the squadron received the first of four new HC-130J Combat King II aircraft.

Operations
When in a theater of combat, squadron members operate at the direction of the overall theater combatant commander and the theater's commander of air forces. In these situations, the 130th is primarily assigned to conduct personnel recovery operations—rescuing downed airmen or other isolated personnel from enemy territory, for example. In addition to combat search-and-rescue missions like these, the 130th may also conduct collateral missions: noncombatant evacuation operations, inter- and intra-theater airlift, and support of special operations forces, for example.

Back at home, the 130th Rescue Squadron furnishes trained personnel to respond to state emergencies, such as natural disasters, and to assist civil authorities in the enforcement of the law.   Other 130th missions include non-combat search and rescue (SAR), emergency aeromedical evacuations, humanitarian relief, international aid, counter-drug activities, and support for NASA flight operations.

The 130th RQS has been assigned to support Operation Iraqi Freedom (Iraq) and Operation Enduring Freedom (Afghanistan) in support of the Global War on Terrorism.

Specifics
 Designated 130th Rescue Squadron, and allotted to California ANG, 2003
 Extended federal recognition and activated, 1 October 2003
 Assigned to: 129th Operations Group
 Station: Moffett Federal Airfield, Mountain View, California (Deploys Worldwide)
 Equipment: HC-130J Combat King II

References

External links

Squadrons of the United States Air National Guard
Military units and formations in California
130